Gmina Rybno may refer to either of the following rural administrative districts in Poland:
Gmina Rybno, Warmian-Masurian Voivodeship
Gmina Rybno, Masovian Voivodeship